Enteromius arambourgi is a species of ray-finned fish in the genus Enteromius. It is endemic to Ethiopia.

The fish is named in honor of vertebrate paleontologist Camille Arambourg (1885-1970), who conducted field work in North Africa including Ethiopia, where this barb is endemic.

References

Notes

Enteromius
Fish of Ethiopia
Endemic fauna of Ethiopia
Taxa named by Jacques Pellegrin
Fish described in 1935